The Lingga Regency is a group of islands in Indonesia, located south of Singapore, along both sides of the equator, off the eastern coast of Riau Province on Sumatra island. They are south of the populated Riau Archipelago, known for the industrial island of Batam and the tourist-frequented island of Bintan, although the Lingga Islands themselves are rarely visited due to the infrequent local transportation. The equator goes through the northern tip of Lingga Island, the main island in the archipelago.

Administratively they form a Regency of the Riau Islands Province with an area of 2,266.77 km2  and a population of 86,244 people at the 2010 census and 98,633 at the 2020 census. The regency seat lies at Daik on Lingga Island.

The population are mainly Malay, Bugis and Chinese (predominantly Hakka, Teochew and Hokkien).

Name
This mountain has three sharp teeth as peak, one of them seems to have broken off at its base, and it was immortalised by Malay poets as the symbol of durability. The poem is

Pulau Pandan jauh ke tengah,
Gunung Daik bercabang tiga,
Hancur badan dikandung tanah,
Budi yang baik dikenang juga.

Nearby are the remains of the fort of Benteng Bukit Cening, overlooking the sea. The cannons are still lined up, as if they were awaiting another enemy attack.

Islands
By size and population the most important islands in the archipelago are Lingga and Singkep, then Sebangka and Bakung.
 Lingga with smaller Pulau Alut.
 Pulau Selayar of Riau Islands between Lingga and Singkep.  
 Singkep with Pulau Posek to the west, Pulau Serak to the southwest, and Pulau Lalang to the south.
 Sebangka and Bakung to the northwest of Lingga, with town of Limas, and the islets Senayang, Kapas, Kentar and Mowang.
 Pulau Lobam and Cempah to the west of Sebangka.
 Temiang and Mesawak in the north.

Administrative districts
At the time of the 2010 census, the regency was divided into five districts (kecamatan), but four additional districts were created in 2012 (Singkep Selatan and Singkep Pesisir from parts of Singkep District, and Selayar and Lingga Timur from parts of Lingga District), another in 2018 (Kepulauan Posek - from part of Singkep Selatan District) and three more in 2019 (Bakung Serumpun, Temiang Pesisir and Katang Bidare - all out of Senayang District).

The thirteen districts are tabulated below with their areas and their populations at the 2010 census and the 2020 census. The table also includes the location of the district administrative centres, the number of villages (rural desa and urban kelurahan) in each district and their post codes. Altogether the archipelago contains 509 islands.

Notes: (a) Singkep Barat District comprises 47 islands.
(b) The 2010 population of the new Kepulauan Posek District is included with the figure for Singkep Barat District, from which it was cut out in 2018. (c) Singkep District comprises 32 islands. (d) The 2010 populations of the new Singkep Selatan District and Singkep Pesisir District are included with the figure for Singkep District, from which they were cut out in 2012. (e) Lingga District comprises 71 islands. (f) The 2010 populations of the new Selayar District and Lingga Timur District are included with the figure for Lingga District, from which they were cut out in 2012. (g) Lingga Utara District comprises 12 islands. (h) Senayang District (including the three new districts cut from it in 2019) comprises 324 islands.
(i) The 2010 populations of the new Bakung Serumpun District, Tamiang Pesisir District and Katang Bidare District are included with the figure for Senayang District, from which they were cut out in 2019.

Demographics

Religion

Islam is the dominant religion in the Lingga Islands regency, with 91.40% of the total population identifying themselves as Muslim. Other religions are Buddhism, which forms 5.89% of the total population, Christianity, which forms 2.63% of the total population, Hinduism, which forms 0.02% of the total population and Confucianism, which forms 0.03% of the total population.

Transport
Ferry services to the islands from outside the archipelago come from the provincial capital to the north, Tanjung Pinang on Bintan, including from Singapore.  These days the main industry is fishing.  There are a number of fine beaches with some coral around the Archipelago but there is very little tourism on account of the poor transport links with the outside world.
 Singkep has two ports, Dabo near Dabosingkep and Jago near Sungaibuluh.  Service to the port of Muntok on Bangka Island of Sumatera Selatan ceased operating regularly with the demise of the tin mining industry.  However, a high-speed ferry continues to connect Tanjung Pinang to Singkep, from where local boats may be chartered to Lingga.
 For Lingga, Daik is the major town and port.  It can be reached in a day from Singapore transferring at Tanjung Pinang.

Lingga Roads
Lingga Roads is an anchorage in the Lingga Islands, south of Lingga Island and northeast of Singkep. During World War II, Lingga Roads was used as a fleet anchorage by major units of the Imperial Japanese Navy, in order that these ships be near a source of fuel. It was from Lingga Roads that the main Japanese southern striking force deployed for the Battle of Leyte Gulf.

References

External links
 
 Singkep Community Website
 Descriptions of all the major Riau Islands

Regencies of the Riau Islands
 
Populated places in Indonesia